William Bell Walton (January 23, 1871 – April 14, 1939) was an American lawyer, politician, and U.S. Representative from New Mexico.

Biography
Born in Altoona, Pennsylvania, Walton attended the public schools and the South Jersey Institute, Bridgeton, New Jersey.

In 1891, he moved to Territory of New Mexico, where he studied law, and was admitted to the bar in 1893 and commenced practice in Deming, New Mexico. He was the owner of the newspaper, the Silver City Independent, in nearby Silver City, where he would take up residence. Walton served as a member of the New Mexico Territorial Legislature in 1901 and 1902, then served as County Clerk of Grant County in 1903–1906.

In 1908, Walton was selected as the delegate to the Democratic National Convention, then served as chairman of the New Mexico Democratic Central Committee in 1910.

Next, he went to Washington, D.C., to lobby for statehood for the territory, as a member of the New Mexico Constitutional Convention in 1911.

After New Mexico became a state, Walton served in the New Mexico Senate in 1912–1916.

Walton was elected as a Democrat "At-Large" to the Sixty-fifth Congress (March 4, 1917 – March 3, 1919). He did not seek renomination, but was an unsuccessful candidate for election to the United States Senate in 1918.

He returned to Grant County and resumed practicing law in Silver City, New Mexico. On November 2, 1926, Walton was elected District Attorney of New Mexico's Sixth Judicial District, he was reelected in 1928 and served until 1932. He continued the practice of law until 1934 when he retired from active pursuits.

He had three children, Leona Walton Neblett (a talented concert violinist and violin teacher), Eda Lou Walton Mandel (poet on the faculty of New York University, head of the English Department), and William B. Walton, Jr.

He died in Silver City on April 14, 1939, and was interred in the local Masonic Cemetery.

References

1871 births
1939 deaths
19th-century American newspaper publishers (people)
19th-century American lawyers
20th-century American politicians
Politicians from Altoona, Pennsylvania
People from Silver City, New Mexico
County clerks in New Mexico
District attorneys in New Mexico
Members of the New Mexico Territorial Legislature
Democratic Party New Mexico state senators
Democratic Party members of the United States House of Representatives from New Mexico